is a character in Resident Evil (Biohazard in Japan), a survival horror video game series created by Japanese company Capcom. She was first introduced as a supporting character in the original Resident Evil (1996) and became player character of the prequel game Resident Evil Zero (2002). In the first Resident Evil, Rebecca is a young officer with the Raccoon Police Department's Special Tactics And Rescue Service (S.T.A.R.S.) unit and is trapped in a zombie-infested mansion. Zero depicts the events before that ordeal, during which she is separated from her team and forced to partner with escaped convict Billy Coen to survive similar circumstances. After escaping Raccoon City, Rebecca became a university professor, creating medicines for viruses.

Rebecca also appears in several Resident Evil games and is one of the heroes of the Resident Evil novel series, that includes novelizations of earlier series materials as well as animated film. She was played by American actress Erin Cahill in the CG animated sequel, Resident Evil: Vendetta (2017) and Resident Evil: Death Island (2023).

Rebecca has received mostly positive reviews from video game publications, with some critics praising her for being a formidable female character who does not conform to stereotypical gender norms.

Concept and design

Introduced in Resident Evil Zero, her character design was created after the game was first developed for the Nintendo 64. Her standard outfit is rather androgynous, Rebecca's alternate costumes in the games "expose her midriff and voluptuous shape". Her design was also adjusted when she lost her beret and shoulder pads. While Chris Redfield and Jill Valentine seem to have been in the Resident Evil cast from the start, Rebecca and Barry Burton were not. In pre-production, other characters were conceived. Dewey, an African-American man, was intended to perform a comic relief role, while Gelzer, a big cyborg, was a typical "strongman" character. Both were later replaced, by Rebecca and Barry, respectively. In the prototype's story, either Rebecca or Billy could die with the other character surviving and completing the game. This idea was scrapped as Rebecca dying would ruin the canon of the Resident Evil timeline. The game's director Shinji Mikami said in 2014: "If I had to name the woman character I most disliked in my games it would be Rebecca Chambers. She’s submissive, she’s not independent. I didn’t want to include her but the staff wanted that kind of character in the game, for whatever reason. I’m sure it made sense to them. And in Japan, that character is pretty popular." In the remake of RE0, Rebecca's has pre-order bonuses, including a nurse costume for her. In the film Resident Evil: Vendetta, Hiroyuki Kobayashi and the team decided to use Rebecca's addition in order to generate another contrast with Resident Evil 6.

Portrayal 

In the original Resident Evil, Rebecca is portrayed in the game's live-action cut-scenes by an unknown actress simply credited as "Linda" and voiced by an uncredited Lynn Harris, who also worked as the voice-over director of the game. In 2002 Resident Evil, she was voiced by English actress Hope Levy, and Ami Koshimizu in Japanese. In Resident Evil 0, she was voiced by Riva Di Paola. In Resident Evil: The Umbrella Chronicles and Resident Evil: The Mercenaries 3D, she was voiced by Stephanie Sheh. In Resident Evil: Vendetta, she was voiced by English actress Erin Cahill and Japanese actress Ami Koshimizu.

Appearances

In Resident Evil series
Rebecca Chambers makes her first appearance in the original 1996 Resident Evil as a supporting character for Chris Redfield, a fellow officer in the U.S. special police force Special Tactics And Rescue Service (S.T.A.R.S.). She is an 18-year-old rookie member of the unit's Bravo Team and serves as a field medic additionally in charge of rear security. Before she joined the force, she was a child prodigy and graduated from college at only 18 years old. Rebecca arrives at the Arklay Research Facility to investigate a series of cannibalistic murders with her comrades lost and scattered across the Arklay Mountains. Her introduction and other appearances throughout the first game vary depending on the path the player chooses and she can be controlled during portions of the story. She may die an off-screen death as well. Canonically, Rebecca is ultimately rescued by Chris and the Alpha Team and she emerges as Bravo Team's sole survivor of the incident in the canon version of the story.

In Resident Evil Zero, a prequel to Resident Evil, Rebecca is one of two protagonists. Shortly after Bravo Team had been dispatched to the Arklay Mountains to investigate the murders, she enters a seemingly abandoned train. Coming under attack by zombies and mutated animals, Rebecca encounters escaped death-row military prisoner Billy Coen and cooperates with him. The two discover that the viral zombie outbreak has been masterminded by James Marcus who had been one of the Umbrella Corporation's top scientists but was assassinated on behalf of the company, only to be revived by the monsters created by him. Rebecca and Billy escape from the train and find themselves in an old underground facility of Umbrella Corporation that was overtaken by Marcus in his lust for revenge. In the end, they manage to destroy both Marcus and the facility. Rebecca allows Billy to escape, falsely reporting his death to the authorities.

Rebecca appears in Resident Evil: The Umbrella Chronicles which summarizes the events of Resident Evil Zero and details her later experiences leading up to Resident Evil. The game pairs her with fellow STARS Bravo team member Richard Aiken as they work together to fend off hordes of undead creatures.

She has survived the events of Resident Evil 2, in which the character makes an easter egg type cameo appearance in an undeveloped film on Wesker's desk. Rebecca is also a playable character in Resident Evil 5: Gold Edition in its minigame mode Mercenaries Reunion, as well as an unlockable character in Resident Evil: The Mercenaries 3D.

In film 
A computer-animated film starring Rebecca was released in 2017, titled Resident Evil: Vendetta. In the film, Rebecca, long retired as a police officer, now works in university as a professor, using her knowledge of medicine to develop possible cures for viruses. When her laboratory is attacked by bio-terrorists, Rebecca is exposed to the new A-virus but uses her newly researched vaccine to save herself. She also appears in the sequel, Resident Evil: Death Island. She was voiced by English actress, Erin Cahill and Japanese actress, Ami Koshimizu.

Other appearances
Rebecca plays a central role in S. D. Perry's Resident Evil novels published between 1998 and 2004, particularly the original stories Resident Evil: Caliban Cove and Resident Evil: Underworld, and the novelizations of the games in which she appears (Resident Evil: The Umbrella Conspiracy and Resident Evil: Zero Hour).

In 2012, Capcom's themed restaurant "Biohazard Cafe & Grill S.T.A.R.S." featured an undescribed "Rebecca-Style Dessert" on their menu.

In the 2015 Japan-exclusive stage play Biohazard: The Stage, Rebecca is a professor at a Western Australia university that becomes the scene of a bioterrorism incident, which reunites her with Chris Redfield as they once again work together. She was portrayed by Rin Asuka. 

In 2022, Rebecca appears to be a playable character in the asymmetrical survival horror game Dead by Daylight.

Reception

Rebecca has received mostly positive reception. Some video game journalists, such as  PlayStation Official Magazine, felt that "her starring role in Resident Evil Zero made her a fan favourite." Edge listed Rebecca, as "strong, non-exploitative female leads" who are "undeniably attractive, but they don't ponce about in leather cat suits." Spanish magazine PlanetStation ranked her as second top "pair of neurons" in their 1999 listings of the best PlayStation characters. In 2008, Chris Buffa of GameDaily featured her as its "Babe of the Week" as "a true American hero". Thilo Bayer of PC Games Hardware also included her among the 112 most important female characters in games. Andrew Clouther of GameZone ranked Rebecca as tenth of badass females in the Resident Evil franchise, she said that "Her first mission involved zombies, trains and mansions. While timid around her fellow S.T.A.R.S. members, she proves to be skilled in both combat and medical assistance." In 2017, Inverses Jessica Famularo ranked her as the sixth best character in the series, said that "Rebecca may seem vulnerable, but she’s actually a fiercely loyal companion and capable field medic. Folks love her for her soft, gentle personality — it’s certainly a pleasant contrast to the chaos going on in the world around her." In May 2019, Brittany Vincent of SyFy described Rebecca as a "video game heroine." She also said that "Unlike Jill or Claire, Rebecca never really got a chance to shine after Resident Evil 0, but she kicked enough ass in her one starring game to last the whole damn series. Her bravery in the face of Umbrella's nightmare is the reason why she's May's Video Game Heroine of the Month." In March 2022, Brendan Caldwell of Rock Paper Shotgun noted that Rebecca was a minor NPC who became a major character. Despite saying that "Resident Evil characters have a hard time retaining a personality as it is, she was seen as interesting enough by the developers to make her the co-protagonist of Resident Evil 0." 

Joystiqs David Hinkle praised her inclusion in Resident Evil 5s downloadable content, similarly stating "we're all for bringing [her] back." GameRevolutions David Lozada wanted to see a lesser known character like Rebecca on Resident Evil 8. While evaluating which of the Resident Evil heroes is best dressed to survive a real-life zombie apocalypse, Matt Cundy of GamesRadar+ found Rebecca to be "more practically attired than Ada Wong or Jill Valentine" and remarked on her looks of a "pre-pubescent tom boy."

Rebecca also received some negative reactions from reviewers. A Resident Evil designer, Shinji Mikami said that Rebecca is one of his least favorite female character in the series, he said that "she's submissive and not independent". In Tropes vs. Women in Video Games, feminist media critic Anita Sarkeesian criticized Rebecca's alternate costumes as overly sexualized, particularly the nurse and cheerleader costumes. One of the essays in Nadine Farghaly's Unraveling Resident Evil also criticized and compared Rebecca to a "typical trope" of "a virgin or tomboy".

References

Capcom protagonists
Characters in American novels of the 20th century
Female characters in video games
Fictional American people in video games
Fictional American police officers
Fictional chemists
Fictional female medical personnel
Fictional professors
Fictional special forces personnel
Fictional police officers in video games
Resident Evil characters
Video game characters based on real people
Video game characters introduced in 1996
Video game protagonists